Shona Le Mottee is a Canadian celtic/pop fiddler and vocalist who previously lived in Vancouver, British Columbia. In 2019 she relocated to Glasgow, Scotland.

Shona has an extensive musical career which took off in 1995 when she was chosen to join the internationally known Canadian Celtic-pop group, "The Paperboys". In 1997, Le Mottee recorded the album "Molinos" with The Paperboys. It was released on the Stony Plain Records/Warner Canada label and won the Canadian Juno Award in March 1998 for "The Best Roots and Traditional Album - Group" category. Le Mottee also recorded two music videos with The Paperboys which were broadcast across the country on "CMT" and "MuchMusic". In 1998/99, Le Mottee performed with Michael Flatley's "Lord of the Dance" at the New York Casino in Las Vegas and at Disney World in Orlando, Florida.
Shona Le Mottee has also been a fiddle instructor for over 17 years.  From 2002 - 2007, she was invited to be on staff at The Rocky Mountain Fiddle Camp in Colorado and The Coast Strings Fiddle School in B.C., Canada.
In 2005, Le Mottee released her debut solo album, "Destination Grouville".
She has also performed and recorded with: 6x World Champions  Simon Fraser University Pipe Band, English songsmith Tim Readman, West African folk musician Alpha Yaya Diallo, Irish party bands The Town Pants and The Pat Chessell Band, and Celtic Folk band Mad Pudding.

External links 
 Myspace
 Thistle and Shamrock

Year of birth missing (living people)
Living people
21st-century violinists